Rögnvaldur Ingþórsson (born 20 May 1968) is an Icelandic cross-country skier. He competed at the 1992 Winter Olympics and the 1994 Winter Olympics.

References

External links
 

1968 births
Living people
Icelandic male cross-country skiers
Olympic cross-country skiers of Iceland
Cross-country skiers at the 1992 Winter Olympics
Cross-country skiers at the 1994 Winter Olympics
Place of birth missing (living people)
20th-century Icelandic people